John Giles, Gelys or Jelys (by 1487 – 1553), of Bowden in Ashprington and Totnes, Devon, was an English politician.

He was a Member (MP) of the Parliament of England for Totnes in 1529.

References

15th-century births
1553 deaths
English MPs 1529–1536
Members of the Parliament of England (pre-1707) for Totnes